Corybas walliae, commonly known as Zeller's spider orchid, is a species of orchid endemic to New Zealand.

References

External links 
 
 

walliae
Flora of New Zealand
Plants described in 2016